Landru (US  title: Bluebeard) is a 1963 French motion picture drama directed by Claude Chabrol. The screenplay was written by Françoise Sagan. The film stars Charles Denner, Michèle Morgan, Danielle Darrieux and Hildegard Knef.

It was based on the story of French serial killer Henri Désiré Landru, who murdered and dismembered more than 10 women during World War I.

Plot
During World War I, a seemingly respectable middle-aged man Henri Landru has devised an ingenious means of obtaining money to supplement his dwindling income.  Adopting various assumed names, he lures middle-class women to his villa at Gambais just outside Paris, where he kills them and burns their bodies.  He then helps himself to his victims’ bank accounts so that he can keep his wife, his mistress and his four children in the manner to which they have grown accustomed.   Having murdered ten women and one boy, Landru is finally captured and placed before a court of law.  Eloquent in his protestations of innocence, he is confident that no jury will condemn a man of such intellect and breeding.

Cast

External links
Landru at Films de France

Italian crime drama films
French crime drama films
1963 films
Films set in the 1910s
1960s black comedy films
1960s crime drama films
French biographical films
Films directed by Claude Chabrol
French serial killer films
French black comedy films
Films based on works by Françoise Sagan
Cultural depictions of Henri Désiré Landru
Cultural depictions of Georges Clemenceau
1963 comedy films
1963 drama films
1960s French films
1960s Italian films